Pincer nails are a toenail disorder in which the lateral edges of the nail slowly approach one another, compressing the nailbed and underlying dermis. It occurs less often in the fingernails than toenails, and there usually are no symptoms.

Hereditary pincer nails have been described although the genes or mutations causing the hereditary form seem to be unknown.

See also
Nail anatomy
List of cutaneous conditions

References

Conditions of the skin appendages